Onetto may refer to:

People
 Cristian Onetto, a Chilean Rugby Union footballer
 Rodolfo Onetto, an Argentine actor
 Victoria Onetto, an Argentine actress